Joe Kwashie Gidisu is a politician and teacher and a former Minister for Roads and Highways of Ghana.

Early life and education
Joe Gidisu was born on 22 February 1952 at Bakpa Alabonu in the Volta Region of Ghana. He had his primary education at the Bakpa Alabonu Local Authority Primary School between 1959 and 1963.

He then attended the Mafi Devime Local Authority Middle School which he completed in 1967. He then proceeded to the Kibi Men's Training College where he obtained the Teachers' Certificate 'A'. Between 1975 and 1977, he attended the Advanced Teacher Training College at Winneba where he obtained the Specialist Teachers' Certificate.

Gidisu then attended the University of Ghana where he obtained B.A. Hons in 1981. He proceeded to the Netherlands where he undertook postgraduate studies at the Institute of Social Studies, The Hague where he obtained the M.A. in Development Studies.

Career
Gidisu taught at the Bontibor Local Authority Primary School between 1971 and 1973. After leaving the Kibi Men's Training College, he taught at the Dormaa Secondary School between 1977 and 1978.

Politics
Gidisu was elected as Member of Parliament for North Tongu in the December 2000 parliamentary election. After boundaries were redrawn, he stood for and won the seat for the Central Tongu in the 2004 Ghanaian parliamentary election and occupied that seat in January 2005.

He retained his seat in the 2008 Ghanaian parliamentary election. Following this election, he was appointed as Minister for Roads and Highways in February, 2009 by John Evans Atta Mills, President of the Republic of Ghana.

References

External links and sources
Profile on Ghana government website 
Profile on Parliament of Ghana website 

Living people
Year of birth missing (living people)
Ghanaian MPs 2001–2005
Ghanaian MPs 2005–2009
Ghanaian MPs 2009–2013
Ghanaian MPs 2013–2017
Government ministers of Ghana
University of Ghana alumni
Ghanaian educators
National Democratic Congress (Ghana) politicians
People from Volta Region